In thermodynamics, the fundamental thermodynamic relation are four fundamental equations which demonstrate how four important thermodynamic quantities depend on variables that can be controlled and measured experimentally. Thus, they are essentially equations of state, and using the fundamental equations, experimental data can be used to determine sought-after quantities like G (Gibbs free energy) or H (enthalpy). The relation is generally expressed as a microscopic change in internal energy in terms of microscopic changes in entropy, and volume for a closed system in thermal equilibrium in the following way.

Here, U is internal energy, T is absolute temperature, S is entropy, P is pressure, and V is volume.

This is only one expression of the fundamental thermodynamic relation. It may be expressed in other ways, using different variables (e.g. using thermodynamic potentials). For example, the fundamental relation may be expressed in terms of the enthalpy H as

in terms of the Helmholtz free energy F as

and in terms of the Gibbs free energy G as

.

The first and second laws of thermodynamics
The first law of thermodynamics states that:

According to the second law of thermodynamics we have for a reversible process:

Hence:

By substituting this into the first law, we have:

Letting  be reversible pressure-volume work done by the system on its surroundings,

we have:

This equation has been derived in the case of reversible changes. However, since U, S, and V are thermodynamic state functions that depends on only the initial and final states of a thermodynamic process, the above relation holds also for non-reversible changes. If the composition, i.e. the amounts  of the chemical components, in a system of uniform temperature and pressure can also change, e.g. due to a chemical reaction, the fundamental thermodynamic relation generalizes to:

The  are the chemical potentials corresponding to particles of type .

If the system has more external parameters than just the volume that can change, the fundamental thermodynamic relation generalizes to

(The negative sign used with pressure is unusual and arises because pressure represents a compressive stress that tends to decrease volume. Other generalized forces tend to increase their conjugate displacements.)

Relationship to statistical mechanics 

The fundamental thermodynamic relation and statistical mechanical principles can be derived from one another.

Derivation from statistical mechanical principles 
The above derivation uses the first and second laws of thermodynamics. The first law of thermodynamics is essentially a definition of heat, i.e. heat is the change in the internal energy of a system that is not caused by a change of the external parameters of the system.

However, the second law of thermodynamics is not a defining relation for the entropy. The fundamental definition of entropy of an isolated system containing an amount of energy  is:

Here  is a macroscopically small energy interval that is kept fixed. The entropy is thus a measure of the uncertainty about exactly which quantum state the system is in, given that we know its energy to be in some interval of size .

Deriving the fundamental thermodynamic relation from first principles thus amounts to proving that the above definition of entropy implies that for reversible processes we have:

The fundamental assumption of statistical mechanics is that all the  states at a particular energy are equally likely. This allows us to extract all the thermodynamical quantities of interest. The temperature is defined as:

 

This definition can be derived from the microcanonical ensemble, which is a system of a constant number of particles, a constant volume and that does not exchange energy with its environment. Suppose that the system has some external parameter, x, that can be changed. In general, the energy eigenstates of the system will depend on x. According to the adiabatic theorem of quantum mechanics, in the limit of an infinitely slow change of the system's Hamiltonian, the system will stay in the same energy eigenstate and thus change its energy according to the change in energy of the energy eigenstate it is in.

The generalized force, X, corresponding to the external parameter x is defined such that  is the work performed by the system if x is increased by an amount dx. E.g., if x is the volume, then X is the pressure. The generalized force for a system known to be in energy eigenstate  is given by:

Calling this number , we have:

The average defining the generalized force can now be written:

We can relate this to the derivative of the entropy with respect to x at constant energy E as follows. Suppose we change x to x + dx. Since these energy eigenstates increase in energy by Y dx, all such energy eigenstates that are in the interval ranging from E − Y dx to E move from below E to above E. There are

such energy eigenstates. The difference

Note that if Y dx is larger than  there will be energy eigenstates that move from below  to above .

Expressing the above expression as a derivative with respect to E and summing over Y yields the expression:

The first term is intensive, i.e. it does not scale with system size. In contrast, the last term scales as the inverse system size and thus vanishes in the thermodynamic limit. We have thus found that:

Combining this with

Gives:

which we can write as:

Derivation of statistical mechanical principles from the fundamental thermodynamic relation 

It has been shown that the fundamental thermodynamic relation together with the following three postulates

is sufficient to build the theory of statistical mechanics without the equal a priori probability postulate.

For example, in order to derive the Boltzmann distribution, we assume the probability density of microstate  satisfies . The normalization factor (partition function) is therefore

The entropy is therefore given by

If we change the temperature  by  while keeping the volume of the system constant, the change of entropy satisfies

where

Considering that

we have

From the fundamental thermodynamic relation, we have

Since we kept  constant when perturbing , we have . Combining the equations above, we have

Physics laws should be universal, i.e., the above equation must hold for arbitrary systems, and the only way for this to happen is

That is

It has been shown that the third postulate in the above formalism can be replaced by the following:

However, the mathematical derivation will be much more complicated.

References

External links 
The Fundamental Thermodynamic Relation

Thermodynamics
Statistical mechanics
Thermodynamic equations